The last will and testament of Frederica Evelyn Stilwell Cook, who died 9 January 1925, age 68, is thought to be the longest will ever filed for probate.

The will
The will was 1066 pages (95,940 words) and occupied four gilt-edged, leather-bound volumes.  It was entered into probate at Somerset House, the then home of the Principal Probate Registry in London, on 2 November 1925.

Of the four volumes in which the will was bound, two contain 702 pages each, and the other two 406 pages each.  The paper is gilt-edged and the bindings are of leather with heavy corners and canvas covers. Aside from the pages containing the introductory clauses, the pages are ruled with a single column and contain a priced inventory of laces, jewellery, furs, embroideries, dressing bags and objects of art.  A large number of the articles are explained in footnotes.  A large part of the will is in Cook's own handwriting.  It is dated 17 October 1919, but there is a codicil dated 2 March 1924.

Probate of the will was granted to Cook's brother and son, both of them Londoners, the latter a racing motorist.  Practically all of her bequests were to her children, and her two executors were directed to burn her diaries, to bury her wedding ring with her, and to see that her age is not inscribed on her tombstone.  She is buried in Richmond Cemetery, then on the outskirts of London; section J, grave 1289.

Frederica Evelyn Stilwell Cook

Frederica Evelyn Stilwell Cook was the daughter of F. J. Freeland, and married Wyndham Francis Cook, younger son of Sir Francis Cook, 1st Viscount of Monserrate, and Emily Martha Lucas, on 22 November 1887.  Her children were:
Humphrey Wyndham Cook (March 1893 – 1978). Racing driver. His stepson David Blakely was murdered by Ruth Ellis, who became the last woman in Britain to be executed.
Cecil Emily Freda Wyndham Cook b. 1 Jul 1896
Ursula Maud Wyndham Cook b. 20 Nov 1900

References

Wills and trusts in the United Kingdom
1925 in England
Cook, Frederica Evelyn Stilwell